White matter dissection refers to a special anatomical technique able to reveal the subcortical organization of white matter fibers in the human or animal cadaver brain.

The first studies of cerebral white matter (WM) were described by Galen and by the subsequent efforts of Vesalius on human cadaver specimens. The interest for the deep anatomy of the brain  pushed anatomist during centuries to create and develop different techniques  for specimen preparation and dissection in order to better reveal the complex white matter architectural organization.

However, the biggest impact on the dissection of white matter anatomy was made by  Joseph Klingler who developed a new method for specimens preparation and dissection. This technique became more feasible and widely used  due to an increased  quality of dissection and surprising quality of anatomical details. Klingler developed a new method of brain fixation, by freezing already formalin-fixed brains before dissection. First, the water crystallization induced by freezing disrupts the structure of the grey matter (which has a high water content). This process made possible to peel off the cortex from the brain surface without damaging the subcortical white matter organization underneath. Second, the freezing process along the WM fibers, induced a clear separation between them facilitating the dissection by progressive peeling of the fibers.

White matter fibre dissection is nowadays considered as a valuable tool to enhance our knowledge about brain connectivity, and has been used to validate tractographic results and vice versa with good consistency between the two techniques, but also for neurosurgical training and neuroanatomical teaching.

References

Neuroscience
Neurosurgery